Francisco Venegas was a Spanish painter.

Francisco Venegas may also refer to:

Francisco Eduardo Venegas
Francisco Javier Venegas